Ibrahim (5 November 1615 – 18 August 1648) was the Sultan of the Ottoman Empire from 1640 until 1648. He was born in Constantinople, the son of Sultan Ahmed I by Kösem Sultan, an ethnic Greek originally named Anastasia.

He was called Ibrahim the Mad due to his mental condition and behavior. However, historian Scott Rank notes that his opponents spread rumors of the sultan's insanity, and some historians suggest he was more incompetent than mad.

Early life
Ibrahim was born on 5 November 1615, the son of Sultan Ahmed I and his Haseki Sultan and perhaps legal wife, Kösem Sultan. When Ibrahim was 2, his father suddenly died, and Ibrahim's uncle Mustafa I became the new sultan. By that time, Kösem Sultan and her children, including young Ibrahim, had been sent to the Old Palace. After the succession of his brother Murad IV, Ibrahim was confined in the Kafes, which affected his health. Ibrahim's other brothers Şehzade Bayezid, Şehzade Suleiman and Şehzade Kasım had been executed by the order of Sultan Murad IV, and because of that, Ibrahim feared that he was next in the line. However, after his brother's death, Ibrahim became the Sultan of the Ottoman Empire.

Reign

Accession
One of the most notorious Ottoman Sultans, Ibrahim spent all of his early life in the close confinement of the Kafes before succeeding his brother Murad IV (1623–40) in 1640. Two of their brothers had been executed by Murad, and Ibrahim lived in terror of being the next to die. His life was saved only by the intercession of Kösem Sultan, mother of Ibrahim and Murad.

After Murad's death, Ibrahim was left the sole surviving prince of the dynasty. Upon being asked by Grand Vizier Kemankeş Kara Mustafa Pasha to assume the Sultanate, Ibrahim suspected Murad was still alive and plotting to trap him. It took the combined persuasion of Kösem and the Grand Vizier, and personal examination of his brother's dead body, to make Ibrahim accept the throne.

Early years as the sultan
During the early years of Ibrahim's reign, he retreated from politics and turned increasingly to his harem for comfort and pleasure. During his sultanate, the harem achieved new levels of luxury in perfumes, textiles and jewellery. His love of women and furs led him to have a room entirely lined with lynx and sable. Because of his infatuation with furs, the French dubbed him "Le Fou de Fourrures." Kösem Sultan kept her son in check by supplying him with virgins she personally purchased from the slave market, as well as overweight women, for whom he craved.

An account of his reign is given by Demetrius Cantemir. He wrote of Ibrahim: 

Kara Mustafa Pasha remained as Grand Vizier during the first four years of Ibrahim's reign, keeping the Empire stable. With the treaty of Szön (15 March 1642) he renewed peace with Austria and during the same year recovered Azov from the Cossacks. Kara Mustafa also stabilized the currency with coinage reform, sought to stabilize the economy with a new land-survey, reduced the number of Janissaries, removed non-contributing members from the state payrolls, and curbed the power of disobedient provincial governors. During these years, Ibrahim showed concern with properly ruling the empire, as shown in his handwritten communications with the Grand Vizier. Kara Mustafa in turn wrote a memo on public affairs to coach his inexperienced master. Ibrahim's replies to Kara Mustafa's reports show he had actually received a good education. Ibrahim often traveled in disguise, inspecting the markets of Istanbul and ordering the Grand Vizier to correct any problems he observed.

Decadence and crisis

Ibrahim was often distracted by recurring headaches and attacks of physical weakness, perhaps caused by the trauma of his early years. Since he was the only surviving male member of the Ottoman dynasty, Ibrahim was encouraged by his mother Kösem Sultan to distract himself with harem girls and soon fathered three future sultans: Mehmed IV, Suleiman II and Ahmed II. The distractions of the harem allowed Kösem Sultan to gain power and rule in his name, yet even she fell victim to the Sultan's disfavor and left the Imperial Palace.

Ibrahim came under the influence of various unsuitable people, such as mistress of the imperial harem Şekerpare Hatun and the charlatan Cinci Hoca, who pretended to cure the Sultan's physical ailments. The latter, along with his allies Silahdar Yusuf Agha and Sultanzade Mehmed Pasha, enriched themselves with bribes and eventually usurped enough power to secure the execution of Grand Vizier Ḳara Muṣṭafā. Cinci Hoca became Kadiasker (High Judge) of Anatolia, Yusuf Agha was made Kapudan Pasha (Grand Admiral) and Sultanzade Mehmed became Grand Vizier.

In 1644, Maltese corsairs seized a ship carrying high-status pilgrims to Mecca. Since the pirates had docked in Crete, Kapudan Yusuf Pasha encouraged Ibrahim to invade the island. This began a long war with Venice that lasted 24 years—Crete would not completely fall under Ottoman domination until 1669. In spite of the decline of La Serenissima, Venetian ships won victories throughout the Aegean, capturing Tenedos (1646) and blockading the Dardanelles. Kapudan Yusuf enjoyed temporary success in conquering Canea, starting a jealous rivalry with Nevesinli Salih Pasha the recently-installed Grand Vizier.  The rivalry led to Yusuf's execution (January 1646) and the Grand Vizier's deposition (December 1645).

With his cronies in power, Ibrahim's extravagant tendencies went unchecked. He raised eight concubines to the favored position of haseki (royal consort), granting each riches and land. After legally marrying the concubine Telli Haseki, he ordered the palace of Ibrahim Pasha to be carpeted in sable furs and given to her.

Deposition and execution
Mass discontent was caused by the Venetian blockade of the Dardanelles—which created scarcities in the capital—and the imposition of heavy taxes during a war economy to pay for Ibrahim's whims. In 1647 the Grand Vizier Salih Pasha, Kösem Sultan, and the şeyhülislam Abdürrahim Efendi unsuccessfully plotted to depose the sultan and replace him with one of his sons. Salih Pasha was executed, and Kösem Sultan was exiled from the harem.

The next year, the Janissaries and members of the ulema revolted. On 8 August 1648, corrupt Grand Vizier Aḥmed Pasha was strangled and torn to shreds by an angry mob, gaining the posthumous nickname "Hezarpare" ("thousand pieces"). On the same day, Ibrahim was seized and imprisoned in Topkapı Palace. Kösem gave consent to her son's fall, saying "In the end he will leave neither you nor me alive. We will lose control of the government. The whole society is in ruins. Have him removed from the throne immediately."

Ibrahim's six-year-old son Meḥmed was made sultan. The new grand vizier, Ṣofu Meḥmed Pasha, petitioned the sheikh ul-Islam for a fatwā sanctioning Ibrahim's execution. It was granted, with the message "if there are two caliphs, kill one of them." Kösem also gave her consent. Two executioners were sent for; one being the chief executioner who had served under Ibrahim. As the executioners drew closer, it was reported that Ibrahim's last words were: "Is there no one among those who have eaten my bread who will take pity on me and protect me? These cruel men have come to kill me. Mercy! Mercy!" As his mother, Kösem Sultan, and officials watched from a palace window, Ibrahim was strangled on 18 August 1648. His death was the second regicide in the history of the Ottoman Empire.

Family
In addition to his eight Haseki Sultans (the first and only certain case of the coexistence of several Haseki at the same time and a symptom of the loss of prestige and exclusivity of the title which began under Murad IV) he had a large number of concubines, of which only some are known. However, only Şivekar Sultan and Hümaşah Sultan, who also became his legal wife, had any real political power or influence over the sultan. Ibrahim was particularly famous for his brief but intense love obsessions, often with women who were not part of his harem and that he had his agents commandeer around the city.

Other anecdotes related to his harem are Ibrahim's supposed passion for obese women, which would have led Şivekar, called "the fattest woman at Constantinople", to become his favorite, and the story that he drowned 280 concubines in his harem because of a rumor that one of them had had a forbidden relationship with a man, an anecdote however rejected by several historians as invented or exaggerated.

Consorts 

Ibrahim I had eight Haseki Sultan, the last of whom was also his legal wife, plus a number of known and unknown minor concubines:

All of Ibrahim's Hasekis received 1,000 aspers a day except for Saliha Dilaşub Sultan who received 1,300 aspers a day. Ibrahim gifted the incomes of Bolu, Hamid, Nicopolis Sanjaks, and Syria Eyalet to Saliha Dilaşub, Mahienver, Saçbağlı, and Şivekar Sultans respectively. He also lavished the treasury of Egypt upon Saçbağlı and Hümaşah Sultans, and presented the Ibrahim Pasha Palace to Hümaşah. His know consorts were:
 Turhan Sultan, BaşHaseki (First Haseki) and mother, Valide Sultan and regent of Mehmed IV. She was of Russian origin and her original name was Nadya. After her son's accession to the throne, she protected Ibrahim's remaining children from execution, resulting in the definitive abandonment of the Law of Fraticide;  
 Saliha Dilaşub Sultan, also called Aşub Sultan or Aşube Sultan. She was the second Haseki and mother and Valide Sultan of Suleiman II, she was Ibrahim's first concubine. She was of Serbian origin and her original name was Katarina;
 Muazzez Sultan, third Haseki, and the mother of Ahmed II. She premored her son and therefore was never Valide Sultan;
 Ayşe Sultan, the fourth Haseki, she was entitled such in January 1645. She was of Tatar origins;
 Mahienver Sultan, fifth Haseki, she is mentioned for the first time on May 2, 1646. She was of Circassian origin;
 Saçbağlı Sultan, sixth Haseki, she was of Circassian origin and the original name was Leyla;
 Şivekar Sultan, seventh Haseki, she was called "the fattest woman in the capital" and was one of only two politically active spouses of Ibrahim. She was of Armenian descent and her original name was Maria;
 Hümaşah Sultan, Eighth Haseki and Ibrahim's only legal wife, after the wedding she was nicknamed Telli Haseki. She was of Georgian or Circassian descent. She is one of only two politically active spouses. Years after Ibrahim's death, in 1672 she was remarried with the Kaymakam of Constantinople, Ibrahim Paşah;
 Zafire Hatun. Called also Zarife Hatun. Ibrahim's Georgian concubine while he still Şehzade, she became pregnant in violation of harem rules. Kösem Sultan, Ibrahim's mother, handed her over to the kızları agasi Sümbül Ağa to drown her, but the man hid her in his house, where she gave birth to her son. Having discovered this, Kösem exiled them to Egypt, but the ship was attacked. Whether the child was saved and was taken to Malta, it is not known what happened to Zafire;
 Hubyar Hatun. One of the concubines Ibrahim became infatuated with for a while. She was then released and given in marriage to Ibrahim Ağa;
 Şekerpare Hatun. First concubine and then musahibe (companion), treasurer and hostess of the harem;
 Sakizula Hatun. Minor concubine;
 The wife of the Grand Vizier Hezarpare Ahmed Paşah. Falling in love with her, Ibrahim forced her to divorce her husband. In return, both Ahmed Paşah and his son received a daughter of Ibrahim as a wife, respectively the little Beyhan Sultan, at the time one year (according to some sources she was later raised by his ex-wife), and Safiye Sultan, the eldest;
 The daughter of Şeyhülislam Muid Ahmed Efendi. According to A.L. Castellan, Ibrahim asked her for his harem, but her father objected, so the sultan had her kidnapped from the baths, and then sent her home after some time.

Sons 
Ibrahim I had at least ten sons: 
 Şehzade (Fülan) (Before 1640, Constantinople - ?) - with Zafire Hatun. Conceived while Ibrahim was still Şehzade in violation of the rules of the harem, Kösem Sultan, mother of Ibrahim, ordered that the pregnant mother be drowned. She was saved from the kızları agasi and gave birth to a son, who became known as "the bastard of the black eunuch". Having discovered this, Kösem exiled the three to Egypt, but the ship was attacked. The child was taken to Malta, where he was proclaimed "Ottoman prince". He later converted to Christianity and preached under the name of "Ottoman Father". According to the Venetian ambassador, history was among the factors that tended the relations between the Ottoman Empire and the Most Serene Republic of Venice in 1645.
 Mehmed IV (2 January 1642, Constantinople – 6 January 1693, Edirne) – with Turhan Sultan. He became sultan at six, after his father was deposed and killed.
 Suleiman II (15 April 1642, Constantinople – 22 June 1691, Edirne) – with Aşub Sultan. Three months younger than Mehmed, he was therefore locked up in Kafes for most of his life when his half-brother ascended the throne. He eventually became sultan after Mehmed IV.
 Ahmed II (25 February 1643, Constantinople – 6 February 1695, Edirne) – with Muazzez Sultan. He spent most of his life locked up in the Kafes. He became sultan after Suleiman II.
 Şehzade Murad (April 1643, Constantinople – 16 January 1644, Constantinople). 
 Şehzade Selim (19 March 1644, Constantinople – September 1669, Constantinople or Edirne). 
 Şehzade Osman (August 1644, Constantinople – 1646, Constantinople). 
 Şehzade Bayezid (1 May 1646, Constantinople – August 1647, Constantinople). 
 Şehzade Cihangir (14 December 1646, Constantinople – 1 December 1648, Constantinople) - with Şivekar Sultan;
 Şehzade Orhan (October 1648, Constantinople  – January 1650, Constantinople) – with Hümaşah Sultan.
At one point, Ibrahim took a great liking to the infant son of a slave woman, to the extent of preferring the unrelated child to his son Mehmed. Turhan, Mehmed's mother, grew extremely jealous and vented her anger to Ibrahim, who flew into a rage and grabbed Mehmed from Turhan's arms and threw him into a pool. Mehmed would have drowned if a servant had not rescued him. He was left with a permanent scar on his forehead.

Daughters 
Ibrahim I had at least nine daughters: 
 Safiye Sultan (1640, Constantinople - ?) - perhaps with Saliha Dilaşub Sultan. She married Baki Bey, son of the Grand Vizier Hezarpare Ahmed Paşah by his first wife.
Fatma Sultan (between September and December 1642, Constantinople –1657) - perhaps with Turhan Sultan. In 1645 she married Musahip Silahdar Yusuf Paşah, who was executed on January 22, 1646. A month later, her father married her to Musahib Fazlı Paşa, who Ibrahim exiled a couple of months after while causing to divorce them. She was buried in the Yeni Valide mosque. Turhan Sultan took care of her grave. 
 Gevherhan Sultan (1642, Constantinople – 27 October 1694, Edirne) - perhaps with Muazzez Sultan. She married firstly on 23 November 1646 to Cafer Pasha, married secondly to Admiral of the Fleet and vizier Çavușzade Mehmed Pasha (died 1681), married thirdly on 13 January 1692 to Helvacı Yusuf Pasha (died 1714).
 Beyhan Sultan (1645, Constantinople – 15 September 1700, buried in Süleyman I Mausoleum, Süleymaniye Mosque) - perhaps with Turhan Sultan. She married firstly in 1646 to Kücük Hasan Pasha, married secondly in 1647 to Grand Vizier Hezarpare Ahmed Pasha (murdered 1648), married thirdly to Uzun Ibrahim Pasha (executed 1683), married forthly in 1689 to Bıyıklı Mustafa Pasha (died 1699). 
 Ayşe Sultan (1646, Constantinople – 1675, Cairo). She married three times. She married İbşir Mustafa Paşa in 1655 but her husband was executed in the same year. She then married Defterdar Ibrahim Paşah, governator of Cairo, and was widowed in 1664. She finally she married her cousin, the governor of Buda and Cairo Sultanzade Canbuladzade Hüseyn Pasha, son of Fatma Sultan.
 Atike Sultan (?, Constantinople - 1665) - perhaps with Turhan Sultan. Married firstly in 1648 to Sarı Kenan Pasha (executed 1659); married secondly in 1659 to Boşnak İsmail Pasha (killed 1664), married thidrly in 1665 to Hadim Mehmed Pasha and she died short after. 
 Kaya Sultan (?, Constantinople - ?). She married Haydarağazade Mehmed Paşa in 1649, who was executed in 1661.
 Ümmügülsüm Sultan (?, Constantinople - 1654), she was called also Ümmi Sultan. She married in 1653 Abaza Ahmed Pasha (died 1656). She died soon after the wedding.
 Bican Sultan (?, Constantinople - ?). She was proposed in marriage to Kuloğlu Musahip Mustafa Paşah, but he refused her (she would later marry Mehmed IV's daughter, Hatice Sultan, in 1675). She was then married to Cerrah Kasım Paşah, in January 1666.

In popular culture 
The tragic play Ibrahim, the Thirteenth Emperor of the Turks, written by Mary Pix and first performed in 1699, purported to describe incidents in Ibrahim's life. The numbering is correct only if Mehmed the Conqueror is regarded as the First Emperor, and the disputed reign of his son Cem is counted as well.

In the Turkish series, Muhteşem Yüzyıl: Kösem he is portrayed by actor Ridvan Aybars Duzey as a prince and by Tugay Mercan as a Sultan.

In the film Three Thousand Years of Longing (2022), Ibrahim is portrayed by Jack Braddy, with Hugo Vella as him as a child.

References

Further reading
 Rank, Scott. History's 9 Most Insane Rulers (2020) ch 4.

External links
 

1615 births
1648 deaths
Turks from the Ottoman Empire
17th-century Ottoman sultans
Assassinated people from the Ottoman Empire
Ottoman sultans born to Greek mothers
People with mental disorders